In mathematics, for a sequence of complex numbers a1, a2, a3, ... the infinite product

is defined to be the limit of the partial products a1a2...an as n increases without bound. The product is said to converge when the limit exists and is not zero. Otherwise the product is said to diverge.  A limit of zero is treated specially in order to obtain results analogous to those for infinite sums. Some sources allow convergence to 0 if there are only a finite number of zero factors and the product of the non-zero factors is non-zero, but for simplicity we will not allow that here. If the product converges, then the limit of the sequence an as n increases without bound must be 1, while the converse is in general not true.

The best known examples of infinite products are probably some of the formulae for π, such as the following two products, respectively by Viète (Viète's formula, the first published infinite product in mathematics) and John Wallis (Wallis product):

Convergence criteria 
The product of positive real numbers

converges to a nonzero real number if and only if the sum

converges. This allows the translation of convergence criteria for infinite sums into convergence criteria for infinite products. The same criterion applies to products of arbitrary complex numbers (including negative reals) if the logarithm is understood as a fixed branch of logarithm which satisfies ln(1) = 0, with the proviso that the infinite product diverges when infinitely many an fall outside the domain of ln, whereas finitely many such an can be ignored in the sum.

For products of reals in which each , written as, for instance, where , the bounds

show that the infinite product converges if the infinite sum of the pn converges. This relies on the Monotone convergence theorem. We can show the converse by observing that, if , then 

and by the limit comparison test it follows that the two series 

are equivalent meaning that either they both converge or they both diverge.

The infinite product is said to diverge to zero.

For the case where the  have arbitrary signs, the convergence of the sum  does not guarantee the convergence of the product . For example, if , then  converges, but  diverges to zero. However, if  is convergent, then the product  converges absolutely–that is, the factors may be rearranged in any order without altering either the convergence, or the limiting value, of the infinite product. Also, if  is convergent, then the sum  and the product  are either both convergent, or both divergent.

Product representations of functions

One important result concerning infinite products is that every entire function f(z) (that is, every function that is holomorphic over the entire complex plane) can be factored into an infinite product of entire functions, each with at most a single root.  In general, if f has a root of order m at the origin and has other complex roots at u1, u2, u3, ... (listed with multiplicities equal to their orders), then

The above factorization is not unique, since it depends on the choice of values for λn. However, for most functions, there will be some minimum non-negative integer p such that λn = p gives a convergent product, called the canonical product representation. This p is called the rank of the canonical product. In the event that p = 0, this takes the form

In addition to these examples, the following representations are of special note:

The last of these is not a product representation of the same sort discussed above, as ζ is not entire. Rather, the above product representation of ζ(z) converges precisely for Re(z) > 1, where it is an analytic function. By techniques of analytic continuation, this function can be extended uniquely to an analytic function (still denoted ζ(z)) on the whole complex plane except at the point z = 1, where it has a simple pole.

See also
Infinite products in trigonometry
Continued fraction
Iterated binary operation
Infinite expression
Infinite series
Pentagonal number theorem

References

External links
Infinite products from Wolfram Math World
A Collection of Infinite Products – I
A Collection of Infinite Products – II
Sequences and series
Mathematical analysis
Multiplication
 

es:Productorio